Søndre Katland is a coastal lighthouse in the municipality of Farsund in Agder county, Norway. It was completed in 1878. The light emits a white, red, or green (depending on direction) flash every 5 seconds. The site is only accessible by boat and it is not open to the public.

See also
Lighthouses in Norway
List of lighthouses in Norway

References

Lighthouses in Agder
Farsund